À toi de faire... mignonne, released in the US as Your Turn, Darling, is a French-Italian thriller film  based on the 1941 novel Your Deal, My Lovely by Peter Cheyney. It came out ten years after La môme vert-de-gris which had been the first of film of this series.

It was shot at the Billancourt Studios in Paris and on location around the city. The film's sets were designed by the art director René Moulaert.

For the last time Bernard Borderie directed the popular actor Eddie Constantine in a Lemmy Caution adventure.

Guy Delorme, who in 1961 had been the Comte de Rochefort in Borderie's classic film version of The Three Musketeers, acts another time as a scheming bad guy.

Synopsis 
Dr. Whitaker has disappeared after working hard on an innovation which could give either the West or the East an edge in the Cold War. Lemmy Caution, although currently otherwise busy, is assigned to return the scientist.

He is advised to start searching for him by finding in the first place Dr. Whitaker's attractive young fiancée Geraldine.

Of course, Lemmy Caution finds the scientist, beats up the villains even while actually being hopelessly outnumbered, puts everything right and gets the girl.

Cast 
 Eddie Constantine as Lemmy Caution
 Gaia Germani as Geraldine
 Guy Delorme as Dr. Whitaker
 Christiane Minazzoli as Carlotta
 Philippe Lemaire as Pranzetti
 Noël Roquevert as Walker, Caution's superior
 Elga Andersen as Montana
 Henri Cogan as Pierrot
 Hubert Deschamps as Henri Grant
 Robert Berri as Kriss
 Colin Drakeas Colonel Willis

Reception
David Deal judges in "The Eurospy Guide" the film was "not an outright spoof", yet he objects director Bernard Borderie sporting slapstick moments ("silly") during the final showdown in a dairy.

Bibliography

References

External links 
 
 
 Illustrated French description

1963 films
Films directed by Bernard Borderie
Films based on British novels
1960s French-language films
French thriller films
Italian thriller films
1960s thriller films
Films shot at Billancourt Studios
Pathé films
1960s French films
1960s Italian films